Elmer Dyer, A.S.C. (August 24, 1892 – February 8, 1970) was an American cinematographer, the first film cameraman to specialize in aerial photography.

Dyer was born in Lawrence, Kansas and died in Hollywood. During World War II Dyer was assigned to the Army's Motion Picture Unit. He was nominated for an Academy Award for his photography in Air Force (1943).

Selected filmography
 Code of the Northwest (1926)

External links

 

1892 births
1970 deaths
People from Lawrence, Kansas
American cinematographers
Burials at Hollywood Forever Cemetery
United States Army personnel of World War II